Harry Leon Sweeney (December 28, 1915 – May 6, 1980) was a Major League Baseball first baseman who appeared in one game for the Pittsburgh Pirates in 1944.

Sweeney is one of many ballplayers who only appeared in the major leagues during World War II. On the last day of the season (October 1), he appeared in one of the games of a doubleheader against the Philadelphia Blue Jays at Shibe Park. He went 0-for-2 (.000) but handled 10 chances for a fielding percentage of 1.000.

He died at the age of 64 in Columbia, Tennessee.

External links

Retrosheet

1915 births
1980 deaths
Major League Baseball first basemen
Pittsburgh Pirates players
Baseball players from Tennessee
People from Franklin, Tennessee